The 1985 Scheldeprijs was the 72nd edition of the Scheldeprijs cycle race and was held on 30 July 1985. The race was won by Adri van der Poel.

General classification

References

1985
1985 in road cycling
1985 in Belgian sport